Saransk railway station (Saransk-1) is railway station in the city of Saransk, Republic of Mordovia on the Penza Branch of Kuibyshev railroad, connects the major moves Nizhny Novgorod and Kuybyshev Railway.

History 
Rail link between Moscow and Saransk there since 1900. The first building Saransk Railway Station was built in the first half of the 1890s to the beginning of the movement of trains through the station Saransk. In the first half of the 1940s, the station building and station square were reconstructed: train-station area has been increased, and on the place of the original building a new passenger terminal was built. In the mid -2000s it was decided to demolish the old building of the railway station and erect a new rail terminal, which was commissioned in 2009.

References

Saransk
Railway stations in the Russian Empire opened in 1862
1862 establishments in the Russian Empire
Railway stations in Mordovia